Rig-e Kaput (also Romanized as Rīg-e Kapūt; also known as Rīg-e Kapūtī) is a village in Bampur-e Sharqi Rural District, in the Central District of Bampur County, Sistan and Baluchestan Province, Iran. At the 2006 census, its population was 2,389, in 406 families.

References 

Populated places in Bampur County